The following is a list of airports in Kern County, California:

International airports
Meadows Field  is the primary commercial airport serving the county and is one of two international airports serving the San Joaquin Valley. It is located approximately 5 miles northwest of Downtown Bakersfield.

Domestic commercial airports
Inyokern Airport  is a small airport located near Inyokern and Ridgecrest, in the Mojave desert. Although it is mostly used as a general aviation airport, it once had scheduled passenger service and maintains regional cargo service.

Spaceports
Mojave Air and Space Port  is the first inland spaceport in America, the site where SpaceShipOne made three manned space flights in 2004. It is also used as a general aviation airport, experimental aircraft design and testing center, and aircraft storage. It is located in the town of Mojave, in the Mojave Desert.
 see also Edwards Air Force Base, landing site for the North American X-15 and Space Shuttle, listed below under Military airfields

Military airfields
Edwards Air Force Base  is an airfield used by the United States Air Force. It is used for testing experimental military aircraft. Nasa's Dryden Research Center is also located on the base, and is used for testing experimental aircraft for NASA. It is located east of Rosamond and southeast of Mojave, in the Mojave Desert.
Naval Air Weapons Station China Lake  is a naval airborne weapons test center used by the United States Navy. It is located just north of Ridgecrest and Inyokern.

General aviation airports
Bakersfield Municipal Airport  is in Southeast Bakersfield.
California City Municipal Airport  is in California City.
Delano Municipal Airport  is in Delano.
Elk Hills-Buttonwillow Airport  is in Buttonwillow.
Kern Valley Airport  is in Kernville.
Lost Hills Airport  is in Lost Hills.
Mountain Valley Airport  is in Tehachapi.
Poso Airport  is in Poso.
Rosamond Skypark Airport  is in Rosamond.
Shafter Airport , also known as Minter Field, is in Shafter.
Taft Airport  is in Taft
Tehachapi Municipal Airport  is in Tehachapi.
Wasco Airport  is in Wasco.